The 1995 Arab Cup Winners' Cup was the sixth edition of the Arab Cup Winners' Cup held in Sousse, Tunisia between 29 Sep – 12 Oct 1995. The teams represented Arab nations from Africa and Asia.
Club Africain won the final against ES Sahel, both from Tunisia.

Group stage
The ten teams were drawn into two groups of five. Each group was played on one leg basis. The winners and runners-up of each group advanced to the semi-finals.

Group A

Group B

Knock-out stage

Semi-finals

Final

Winners

External links
Arab Cup Winners' Cup 1995 - rsssf.com

1995
1995
1995–96 in Egyptian football
1995–96 in Kuwaiti football
1995–96 in Emirati football
1995–96 in Saudi Arabian football
1995–96 in Algerian football
1995 in African football
1995 in Asian football